László Weiner (9 April 1916 in Szombathely, Hungary – 25 July 1944 in Lukov) was a Hungarian composer, pianist and conductor who was murdered in the Holocaust.

Weiner studied piano and conducting at the Budapest Music Academy and was a composition student of Zoltán Kodály from 1934 to 1940. Weiner was married in 1942 to singer Vera Rózsa.

By February 1943, Weiner had been deported by the Nazis to the Lukov forced labor camp in Slovakia where he was later murdered. Kodály attempted to save Weiner and colleague Jenő Deutsch to no avail.

Due to the efforts of violist Pál Lukács, several of Weiner's compositions were published by Editio Musica Budapest in the 1950s and 1960s.

Selected works
Orchestral
 Concerto for flute, viola, piano, and string orchestra (1941?)
 Overture (published 1995)

Chamber music
 1938: String trio "Vonosharmas Szerenad" for violin, viola, and cello
 Duo for violin and viola (1939)
 Sonata for viola and piano (1939?)
 Two Movements for clarinet and piano

Vocal
 Three Songs (published 1994)

Discography
 Weiner: Chamber Music with Viola, Hungaroton HCD 32607
 In Memoriam: Hungarian Composers, Victims of the Holocaust, Hungaroton HCD32597

References

External links
 Remembering Seven Murdered Hungarian Jewish Composers by Agnes Kory
 
 

1916 births
1944 deaths
People from Szombathely
Franz Liszt Academy of Music alumni
Hungarian classical pianists
Male classical pianists
Hungarian composers
Hungarian male composers
Hungarian conductors (music)
Male conductors (music)
Hungarian Jews
Jewish classical musicians
Jewish composers
Hungarian civilians killed in World War II
Hungarian people executed in Nazi concentration camps
20th-century conductors (music)
20th-century classical pianists
20th-century composers
Hungarian Jews who died in the Holocaust
Hungarian World War II forced labourers
20th-century Hungarian male musicians